Wootton is a village in the civil parish of Denton with Wootton, and the Dover District of Kent, England.

Denton, the other parish village, is 1 mile to the northwest.

History

Wootton was the birthplace of the  mathematician and surveyor Leonard Digges, who some claim invented a functioning telescope some time between 1540 and 1559.

It once had a Baptist chapel, linked to the Eythorne Baptist Church group. The worldwide known Lydden Hill Race Circuit, the so-called "Home of Rallycross", is located near Wootton village. The civil parish is called Denton with Wootton.

References

External links

Villages in Kent
Dover District